Hello Big Man is the 11th studio album by American singer-songwriter Carly Simon, released by Warner Bros. Records, on August 31, 1983.

The album was Simon's last for Warner Bros. (and for what became the Warner Music Group, having also spent time with Elektra Records), as it was a commercial disappointment upon release, despite a positive reception from critics. The album featured Sly Dunbar and Robbie Shakespeare on a number of tracks, including one Bob Marley cover.

The title of the album is an allusion to the reply that Simon's mother, Andrea Simon, gave to her father, Richard Simon, when they first met. He said "hello little woman", and she replied "hello big man".

Reception

Writing in Rolling Stone, Don Shewey called the album "Carly Simon's best in years," stating that she "has returned to the sort of beautiful, folk-based singing and songwriting that originally made the world fall in love with her." He singled out "It Happens Everyday" and the title track as "two of the album's best songs," and also stated "her rendition of Bob Marley's ‘Is This Love?’ is particularly terrific, especially the way Simon's light, floating soprano mixes with Sly and Robbie's exquisite funk foundation."

In a retrospective review from AllMusic, William Ruhlmann called the album "a return to the style of Anticipation and No Secrets after years of following trends -- the songs were romantic, with the erotic edge that had charged much of Simon's best material. The album was typically uneven, but also typically personal and compelling." He also singled out the title track as "a winning account of her parents' courting."

Music videos
The music video for the lead single "You Know What to Do" was directed by Dominic Orlando, from a concept by Simon. It was filmed on location in Martha's Vineyard, at her home and in the surrounding woods. The video received moderate airplay on MTV in the autumn of 1983.

Simon also filmed a music video for the title track, "Hello Big Man", which features photos and film footage of her parents. Simon's mother, Andrea Simon, appears at the end of the video. The video also includes the American actor and singer Al Corley, who had also been featured on the cover of Simon's previous album Torch, and with whom Simon had a brief romance.

The music video for the song "It Happens Everyday" was played in movie theaters during "coming attractions".

Track listing
Credits adapted from the album's liner notes.

Personnel

Musicians

Production

Charts
Album – Billboard (United States) 

Singles – Billboard (United States)

References

External links
Carly Simon's Official Website

1983 albums
Carly Simon albums
Warner Records albums
Albums recorded at United Western Recorders